Vyacheslav Viktorovich Afonin (born 5 February 1978) is a Russian football coach and a former player.

References

1978 births
Sportspeople from Tyumen Oblast
People from Tyumen
Living people
Russian footballers
Association football midfielders
FC Tyumen players
Russian Premier League players
FC Baltika Kaliningrad players
Russian football managers
FC Tyumen managers